Morresi is an Italian surname. Notable people with the surname include:

Claudio Morresi (born 1962), Argentinean football player
Giancarlo Morresi (1944–2019), Italian modern pentathlete

Italian-language surnames